Peterborough by-election may refer to:

 1878 Peterborough by-election
 1943 Peterborough by-election
 2019 Peterborough by-election